The Spencer technique (also known as the "7 stages of Spencer") is an articulatory technique used in Osteopathic medicine to help relieve restriction and pain at the shoulder.  Although variations exist, normally 7 steps are included.  Indications for the Spencer technique include adhesive capsulitis.

The following is a common sequence:

 Glenohumeral extension
 Use slow gentle springing motion at the point of resistance and muscle energy.
 Glenohumeral flexion
 Circumduction with compression
 Circumduction with traction
 Abduction of the shoulder joint
 Internal Rotation
 Joint Pump

See also 
Atlas of Osteopathic Techniques, Alexander Nicholas DO FAAO

References

Osteopathic medicine